Seiki may refer to:

Seiki (given name), a Japanese given name
Seiki Digital, an American television manufacturing company
Japanese corvette Seiki, a screw sloop in the Imperial Japanese Navy